Captain Sabertooth (in Norwegian: Kaptein Sabeltann) is a long running series that centers around the eponymous pirate Captain Sabertooth, who was created and was originally portrayed by the Norwegian singer, composer, author and actor Terje Formoe. The series comprises several stage plays, theatrical films, a television series, cartoons, and books, all of which are aimed at small children.

The series was first launched as a series of stage plays. The first play, Captain Sabertooth and the Treasure in Luna Bay, was first performed in Kristiansand Zoo and Amusement Park in Norway where Formoe was Director of Entertainment. The play's success was so great that in 1994 it was followed up with another stage play, Captain Sabertooth and the Secret of Luna Bay, the music of which won Formoe a Spellemann prize, the Norwegian equivalent of the Grammy Awards. The plays have since been followed up with several theatrical films, which have proven to be very popular in Norway.

In 2014 the film Captain Sabertooth and the Treasure of Lama Rama was released. Its cost was 50 million Norwegian kroner (roughly US$6,600,000 or EUR 7,800,000 as of May 2015), making it the most expensive children's film to date in Norwegian history.

Premise

Captain Sabertooth is head of a band of pirates, who are sailing together in their ship called The Dark Lady (Den Sorte Dame). Among the other pirates are Pirate Wally (Pelle Pirat) a fat and somewhat clumsy man, and Tiny (Pinky), a young guy fighting for recognition from the other pirates.

Other characters are Red Rudy (Røde Ruben), a former sailor who lives together with Aunt Bessie (Tante Bassa) in Luna Bay (Kjuttavika). He wants to be an honest and peaceful man, but is maniacally interested in gold and jewels, an interest he shares with the pirates. He and Bessie work in a tavern together with her niece Veronica (Sunniva). Veronica and Tiny become friends.

Performances

Stage plays

Filmography
Kaptein Sabeltann og hemmeligheten i Kjuttaviga (1994)
Drømmen om kaptein Sabeltanns rike (1996)
Kaptein Sabeltann og den forheksede øya (2000)
Kaptein Sabeltann og jakten på den magiske diamant (2002)
Captain Sabertooth (2003)
Captain Sabertooth and the Treasure of Lama Rama (2014)
Captain Sabertooth and the Magic Diamond (2019)

Cast

Merchandise

Books
1993: Kaptein Sabeltann og 40 andre sanger, the first song book
1993: Kaptein Sabeltann og gutten som ville bli sjørøver, illustrated by Gro Vik Fiadu and Morten Myklebust
1994: Kaptein Sabeltann og jakten på sultanens skatt!, illustrated by Morten Myklebust
1994: Kaptein Sabeltann lukter gull
1995: Kaptein Sabeltann og Joachim : på eventyr med Den sorte dame, picture book illustrated by Morten Myklebust
1995: Kaptein Sabeltann : hvor er nøkkelen? : en myldrebok, idea, text and drawings by Egil Nyhus
1996: Kaptein Sabeltanns store sangbok, illustrated by Egil Nyhus
2001: Kaptein Sabeltann og heksegryta, children's picture book with idea, text and drawings by Egil Nyhus
2002: Pinky blir en av Kaptein sabeltanns menn
2003: Kaptein Sabeltann og Pinky på tokt med Den sorte dame, picture book illustrated by Egil Nyhus
2005: Kaptein Sabeltann og Pinky på skattejakt i Kjuttaviga, picture book illustrated by Egil Nyhus
 2005: Kaptein Sabeltanns sangbok: Hiv o'hoi snart er skatten vår!, illustrated by Egil Nyhus
 2007: Kaptein Sabeltanns sangbok 2 : Kongen på havet, the 4th song book
 2008: Kaptein Sabeltann pekebok, illustrated by Egil Nyhus
 2008: Terje Formoe/Egil Nyhus: Kapteins Sabeltanns 10 MYNTER AV GULL – the first pop-up book in Norway
 2009: Terje Formoe/Egil Nyhus: Miriams forheksede hus – children's picture book with pockets
 2009: Formoe/Nyhus: Kaptein Sabeltann og bokstavjakten - an alphabet book
 2010: Pinky og Sunniva i Kaptein Sabeltanns Verden
 2011: Kaptein Sabeltann og Pinky på den forheksede øya
 2012: Kaptein Sabeltann, Pinky og Ravn i Abra Havn - book about the third episode of the TV-series Kaptein Sabeltann-kongen på havet
 2013: Kaptein Sabeltann og blindpassasjerene - book about the first episode of the TV-series 
 2012: Formoe/Nyhus: Kaptein Sabeltanns puslespillbok - a puzzle book
 2013: Kaptein Sabeltann og heksegryta - republished with stickers
 2013: Formoe/Nyhus: Min første bok om Kaptein Sabeltann
 2013: Formoe/Nyhus: Kaptein Sabeltann - Den Sorte Dame
 2014: Formoe/Nyhus: Kaptein Sabeltann og skattekartet
 2014: Formoe/Nyhus: Kaptein Sabeltann - to sanger og åtte kjente sanger

Comics and magazines
1994: Kaptein Sabeltann og jakten på sultanens skatt!, illustrated by Morten Myklebust
2000–2005: Kaptein Sabeltann aktivitetsblad, released four times a year
Kaptein Sabletanns advent calendar
2006: Kaptein Sabletanns verden, monthly magazine

Games
1997: Kaptein Sabeltann og den store ildprøven, CD-ROM, directed by Simen Svale Skogsrud
2004: Kaptein Sabeltann, CD-ROM, produced by Artplant AS, published by Pan Vision in Stockholm, based on Terje Formoe figures
2007: Kaptein Sabeltann og grusomme Gabriels forbannelse, CD-ROM, produced by Artplant AS, published by NSD
2011: Kaptein Sabeltann, Nintendo DS, manufactured by Ravn Studio AS, release date 1 July
2014: Kaptein Sabeltann på nye tokt, iPhone/iPad, produced by Ravn Studio AS
2020: Captain Sabertooth and the Magic Diamond, PC/Switch, produced by Ravn Studio AS - https://store.steampowered.com/app/1383970/Captain_Sabertooth_and_the_Magic_Diamond/ & https://www.nintendo.co.uk/Games/Nintendo-Switch-download-software/Captain-Sabertooth-and-the-Magic-Diamond-1880242.html?nsuid=70010000029625

Captain Sabertooth's World

In 1995 a Captain Sabertooth themed section of the Kristiansand Zoo and Amusement Park was opened. The area has a pirate village theme and contains various attractions, restaurants, and shops that are centered around the character of Captain Sabertooth and the other characters in the series. In the summer the park holds several shows and features, including one that allows guests to ride on Sabertooth's ships The Dark Lady and The Countess.

Abra Havn

On the eastern side of the small lake by Captain Sabertooth's World is built a pirate village called Abra Havn. The pirate village consists of buildings that gives an illusion of a pirate society, surrounded by a high wall. During the high season apartments are rented out inside the pirate village.

References

External links
 
 Norwegian website

Fictional pirates
Fictional Norwegian people
Norwegian plays
Kristiansand
Kristiansand Zoo and Amusement Park
Pirate books
Pirate films
Norwegian animated films
Television series about pirates
Films set in the Caribbean
Caribbean in fiction
Grappa Music artists
Male characters in literature
Plays adapted into films
Plays adapted into television shows
Norwegian musicals